Saltfleet District High School is a member school of the Hamilton-Wentworth District School Board.  

Opened in 1996, Saltfleet is the most recent secondary school to be opened by the Board. The school had a 2009-2010 enrolment of 1250. The school uses the Ontario Secondary School Literacy Test (OSSLT) to assess Grade 10 students' skills in reading and writing. Successful completion of the test is one of 32 requirements students need to attain in order to receive an Ontario Secondary School Diploma.  Saltfleet also offers special education classes as well as an ESL program and is one of two schools in Canada with a fully operated observatory.

The original Saltfleet District High School was opened in 1927, and had numerous additions to increase the number of rooms from 6 to 42.  The new school was built to offer a bigger building with more up to date facilities.

Program highlights and student support programs
Saltfleet District High School takes part in the following programs:
 Horticultural Technology
 Hospitality and Tourism
 Small Engines
 Landscape Design
 Communications (includes TV studio)
 English/Technology Yearbook Course
 Basketball Focus Course
 Rugby Focus Course
 Photography
 Fitness
 Enhanced Mathematics
 Link Crew Peer Mentoring (Grade 9)
 Peer Mentoring Classroom support
 Elite Program (1/2 Day Alternative Education program)
 At risk Co-operative Education
 Ontario Youth Apprenticeship Program
 Connecting College through Co-op Program
 Credit Recovery
 Learning Strategies Course
 Student Success Teachers
 Student Success Drop-in Room
 Learning Resource Department
 Guidance Counsellors
 Ontario Secondary School Literacy Course (OSSLC)
 After school remediation program
 STEP program (summer program for incoming Grade 9s)
 Grade 9 Transitions Program – Step Toward Tech Day
 Program Pathways Endorsements

Sports and clubs
Saltfleet District High School has the following sports teams and clubs within the school:
 Drama Club (student-run)
 Senior Band
 Junior Band
 Choir
 Guitar Club
 Stage Crew (student-run)
 “The Forecast” Student Newspaper
 Positive Space
 Storm Link Crew
 Basketball (Boys’ and Girls’, Senior and Junior)
 Cross Country
 Volleyball (Boys’ and Girls’, Senior and Junior)
 Girls’ Field Hockey
 Boys’ Football (Junior and Senior)
 Swim team
 Ice Hockey (Boys and Girls)
 Basketball  (Boys Midget, Junior, Senior, Girls Junior and Senior)
 Indoor Soccer (Boys and Girls)
 Soccer  (Boys and Girls)
 Track and Field
 Badminton
 Golf (Boys and Girls)
 Rugby (Boys Midget, Junior, Senior, Girls Senior)

Since 2011, Saltfleet’s clubs and teams have been overseen by the Saltfleet Student Parliament. In addition to supporting extracurriculars, the Student Parliament hosts dances, spirit weeks, pep rallies, and the annual Winter Formal, in addition to doing advocacy work on behalf of the students. Elections for the school’s Executive Cabinet take place in May for the following year’s government, and all students are welcome to join Student Parliament in September as Members of Parliament (MPs). A new constitution was ratified in 2017 to replace the original 2012 constitution and further define the roles of the Student Parliament and the Executive Cabinet.
   
In late 2020, the school reduced its class variety and clubs due to the COVID-19 pandemic. They are slowly recovering from the pandemic with band and drama club starting up in September, 2021.

See also
List of high schools in Ontario

External links
Saltfleet District High School

High schools in Hamilton, Ontario
Educational institutions established in 1996
1996 establishments in Ontario